The African Political Organization, later known as the African People's Organization (APO), was a coloured political organisation in early-20th-century South Africa. Founded in Cape Town in 1902, the organisation rallied South African coloureds against the South Africa Act 1909.

Trafalgar High School was created as a direct result of criticism of the Cape School Board in the APO newspaper in August 1911. Investigations found that the board had created no benefit at all for students who were non-white. Abdullah Abdurahman lobbied the board and the first school for coloured children was created. The school was led by Abdullah Abdurahman's prodigy, Harold Cressy.

The APO represented South African coloured protest politics while also publishing a major newspaper called The APO until its demise in 1923.

See also
 Abdullah Abdurahman, prominent leader and Cape Town city councillor
Teachers' League of South Africa (TLSA)

References

Defunct civic and political organisations in South Africa
1902 establishments in South Africa
Organizations established in 1902
Political parties of minorities